Colin Standing (birth registered 30 May 1942) is a Welsh former rugby union, and professional rugby league footballer in the 1960s and 1970s.

Background
Colin Standing's birth was registered in Bridgend, Wales.

Playing career

International honours
Standing won two caps for Wales (RL) while at Wigan and Oldham in 1969–1970.

Notable tour matches
Standing played number eight for the combined Bridgend-Maesteg XV in the 12-23 defeat by Fiji during the 1964 Fiji rugby union tour of Europe and Canada at Brewery Field on Saturday 12 September 1964. A quote in the programme of this game. Colin Standing (Bridgend) " No. 8. Aged 21 years. 6ft 2ins. Joined Bridgend 1961-62. Former clubs - Tondu, Cefn Cribbwr, London University. Full back until 18 years old. Glamorgan County and Welsh Trials reserve. One of the outstanding young players in the side. Good handler of the ball, powerful runner, and a natural athlete. No. 8 player that will reach the top. Industrial Chemistry Student."

References

External links
Statistics at orl-heritagetrust.org.uk
Statistics at wigan.rlfans.com
Bridgend → Past Players → S
Statistics at bridgendravens.co.uk

1942 births
Living people
Bridgend RFC players
Oldham R.L.F.C. players
Rugby league players from Bridgend
Rugby league second-rows
Rugby union number eights
Rugby union players from Bridgend
Wales national rugby league team players
Warrington Wolves players
Welsh rugby league players
Welsh rugby union players
Wigan Warriors players